The Barcelona Ladies Open was a tennis tournament for women held in Barcelona in Catalonia (Spain) and was played on outdoor clay courts. It was an International-level tournament on the WTA Tour with total prize money of $220,000.

The tournament began in November 2003 as a $10,000 challenger event on the ITF Women's Circuit. Prize money was increased to $25,000 the following year; in 2005, the event was moved to October with the prize money increasing to $75,000. In 2007, the tournament was upgraded to the Sony Ericsson WTA Tour, becoming a Tier IV played in June, and remained in this classification through 2008. Since 2009, the event has been held in April.

In 2013 the event was cancelled due to financial reasons and replaced on the tour by the Nuremberg Cup in Nuremberg, Germany, held the week before Roland Garros.

Results

Singles

Doubles

See also
 Barcelona Open
 Barcelona WCT
 List of tennis tournaments

References

External links
 Official website 
 ITF website

 
Tennis tournaments in Catalonia
Defunct tennis tournaments in Spain
Ladies
Clay court tennis tournaments
WTA Tour
Recurring sporting events established in 2003
Recurring sporting events disestablished in 2012